Sinatra is a monotypic genus of wasps belonging to the family Figitidae. The only species is Sinatra pacificus.

References

Figitidae